The World Riichi Championship (WRC) is a worldwide competition of Japanese Mahjong (also known as riichi) held every 3 years since 2014. The competition is nominally open to people of all ages, men and women alike. Participants generally consist of Japanese professional Mahjong players and foreign amateur players selected by national organizations from Europe, North America, and elsewhere around the world.

History
The first edition of WRC was organized two brothers, Quentin and Valérian THOMAS, founders of Tri Nitro Tiles (TNT), a French Riichi Mahjong Club in 2014. 

On July 16–20, 2014, the 1st Championship was held in the Mairie de Puteaux (city hall), in the Paris, France region. 

The second edition was organized by the United States Professional Mahjong League (USPML) in 2017. On October 4–8, 2017, the WRC was held at the Palms Casino Resort in Las Vegas, Nevada, USA.  

The third edition will be hosted in Vienna, Austria.  The original date was in August, but concerns over the coronavirus pandemic prompted planners with postponement. The third edition was finally held at the Intercontinental Hotel Vienna in Vienna, Austria on August 25-28, 2022. 

The fourth edition will be hosted in Tokyo, Japan in 2025 to be organized by the Japan Mahjong Professional League.

Qualification
General qualification varies by country and association.  Players from various nations refer to their national organization for qualification.

Champions

Venues

See also
European Riichi Championship
European Mahjong Association (EMA)

References

External links
WRC Official Site

Mahjong world championships